The 2011–12 Midland Football Combination season was the 75th in the history of Midland Football Combination, a football competition in England.

Premier Division

The Premier Division featured 15 clubs which competed in the division last season, along with two new clubs:
Bloxwich United, transferred from the West Midlands (Regional) League
Earlswood Town, promoted from the Division One

League table

References

2011–12
10